Hold On to Me is the fifth studio album by Australian rock band The Black Sorrows. It's the group's first album to feature the vocals of Vika and Linda Bull.

Reception

Rudyard Kennedy from AllMusic gave the album a positive review saying; "[Joe] Camilleri and company may borrow many of the same ingredients that James Morrison uses to make his music -- blues, soul, and R&B, as well as flashes of gospel, country, folk, and even Brill building pop -- but the trick is in mixing those well-worn ingredients together and coming up with something new. That's where Black Sorrows show that they're fit to be mentioned in the same breath with artists like Van Morrison and the Rolling Stones. Every song on Hold On to Me sounds like it could be a classic (and classy) radio staple, without sounding like a copy of anything else. Not only is Hold On to Me'''s literate songwriting (by Camilleri and lyricist Nick Smith) superb, but the playing is also uniformly excellent (and, at times, positively inspired), and vocalists Camilleri and Vika and Linda Bull are soulful and gritty throughout. Hold On to Me'' deserves to be remembered as more than just an Australian classic -- this is a record that deserves to be heard and hailed by music fans the world over."

Track listing

Personnel
Black Sorrows
 Linda Bull – backing vocals 
 Vika Bull – backing vocals
 Mick Girasole – bass
 Peter Luscombe – drums, percussion 
 Wayne Burt – guitar
 Jeff Burstin – guitar, slide guitar, mandolin
 Joe Camilleri (aka Joey Vincent) – saxophone, vocals, slide guitar

Additional personnel 
 George Butrumlis – accordion 
 Gerry Hale – banjo
 Bob Venier – brass
 John Barrett – brass 
 Tony Norris – brass
 Lucky Oceans – guitar 
 Sam See – guitar 
 Tony Faeshe – guitar 
 Jason Bradley – harmonica 
 James Black – keyboards
 Mick O'Connor – keyboards 
 Paul Grabowsky – keyboards 
 R. Starcic - keyboards 
 Alex Pertout – percussion 
 Joe Creighton – vocals 
 Lisa Edwards – vocals
 Nick Smith – vocals
 Venetta Fields – vocals

Technical personnel 
 Richard Lewis – graphic design
 Graeme Fraser – engineering
 Martin Pullan – engineering, mixing
 Doug Brady – mixing
 Ian "Mac" MacKenzie – mixing
 Ross Cockle – mixing
 Tomic – photography
 Jeff Burstin – production
 Joe Camilleri – production

Charts

Weekly charts

Year-end charts

References

External links
 Hold On to Me at AllMusic
 Hold On to Me at Discogs

1988 albums
The Black Sorrows albums
CBS Records albums
ARIA Award-winning albums
Albums produced by Joe Camilleri